The Wahikar Union was a peasants organization in Punjab, India. It was founded in the mid-1970s and functioned as a mass organization of the Punjab Communist Revolutionary Committee (later the UCCRI(ML)).

The Wahikar Union organized a militant mass protest in Jagraon in 1974. Police opened fire on the demonstration, killing one peasant. Later in the same year, on 26 November, an armed demonstration was organized jointly in Bhatinda by Wahikar Union, Punjab Students Union and Bharat Naujavan Sabha. The rally was dispersed by police forces. Several leaders of the protest were arrested.

By 1982 the Wahikar Union had become defunct.

References

Socialist organisations in India
Indian agriculture and forestry trade unions
Organisations based in Punjab, India
1970s establishments in Punjab, India
Organizations established in the 1970s